On-the-record, in journalism, means anything in a communication may be publicly disclosed.

On the Record may also refer to:

Television
 On the Record (British TV programme), a weekly political TV show which aired between 1988 and 2002
 On the Record (American TV program), a legal news show on the Fox News Channel
 On the Record with Bob Costas

Other uses
 On the Record (book), a collection of interviews from important players in the music industry
 On the Record (musical), Walt Disney Theatrical's touring 2004 musical revue
 On the Record (film), 2020 documentary film about sexual assault allegations against Russell Simmons
 On the Record (newspaper), a student newspaper at Toronto Metropolitan University

See also 
 For the Record (disambiguation)
 Off the Record (disambiguation)
 On Record (disambiguation)
 Record (disambiguation)